This is a list of years in Bulgaria.

16th century

17th century

18th century

19th century

20th century

21st century

See also
Cities in Bulgaria
 Timeline of Plovdiv
 Timeline of Sofia
 Timeline of Varna

Further reading

External links
 

 
Bulgaria history-related lists
Bulgaria